The term Blahut–Arimoto algorithm is often used to refer to a class of algorithms for computing numerically either the information theoretic capacity of a channel, the rate-distortion function of a source or a source encoding (i.e. compression to remove the redundancy). They are iterative algorithms that eventually converge to one of the maxima of the optimization problem that is associated with these information theoretic concepts.

History and application
For the case of channel capacity, the algorithm was independently invented by Suguru Arimoto and Richard Blahut. In addition, Blahut's treatment gives algorithms for computing rate distortion and generalized capacity with input contraints (i.e. the capacity-cost function, analogous to rate-distortion). These algorithms are most applicable to the case of arbitrary finite alphabet sources. Much work has been done to extend it to more general problem instances.
Recently, a version of the algorithm that accounts for continuous and multivariate outputs was proposed with applications in cellular signaling. There exists also a version of Blahut–Arimoto algorithm for directed information.

Algorithm for Channel Capacity 
A discrete memoryless channel (DMC) can be specified using two random variables  with alphabet , and a channel law as a conditional probability distribution . For the case of channel capacity, the algorithm was independently invented by Suguru Arimoto and Richard Blahut. independently found the following expression for the capacity of a DMC with channel law: 

 

That is, For all :
 
 Every row sums up to 1, i.e. .

For .

Then, using the theory of optimization, specifically coordinate descent, Yeung showed that the sequence indeed converges to the required maximum. That is, 

.

So given a channel law , the capacity can be numerically estimated up to arbitrary precision.

Algorithm for Rate-Distortion
Suppose we have a source  with probability  of any given symbol. We can find an encoding that minimizes the rate-distortion functional locally by repeating the following iteration until convergence:

where  is a parameter related to the slope in the rate-distortion curve that we are targeting and thus is related to how much we favor compression versus distortion (higher  means less compression).

References 

Coding theory